Jan-Christoph Bartels (born 13 January 1999) is a German professional footballer who plays as a goalkeeper for Waldhof Mannheim.

Career
Bartels made his professional debut for Wehen Wiesbaden in the 2. Bundesliga on 27 September 2019, starting in the match before being substituted out due to injury in the third minute for Lukas Watkowiak, with the match finishing as a 2–0 home win.

In July 2020, it was announced that Bartels would transfer to 3. Liga club Waldhof Mannheim.

References

External links
 
 
 
 
 

1999 births
Living people
Sportspeople from Wiesbaden
Footballers from Hesse
German footballers
Germany youth international footballers
Association football goalkeepers
1. FC Köln players
SV Wehen Wiesbaden players
2. Bundesliga players
Regionalliga players